Escape to the Sun is a 1972 drama film written and directed by Menahem Golan and starring Laurence Harvey, Josephine Chaplin, John Ireland, Lila Kedrova and Jack Hawkins. The film was a co-production between Israel, France and West Germany.

Plot
A group of people wish to flee the Soviet Union to escape anti-semitism and political repression, but their activities soon attract the attention of the KGB secret police.

Cast
 Laurence Harvey – Major Kirsalov
 Josephine Chaplin – Nina Kaplan
 John Ireland – Jacob Kaplan
 Lila Kedrova – Sarah Kaplan
 Jack Hawkins – Baburin
 Yehuda Barkan – Yasha Bazarov
 Yehuda Efroni – Romek
 Peter Capell – Professor Abramowiz

Production
The film is based on a short story by author Uri Dan, and in turn based loosely on the events of the June 1970 Dymshits–Kuznetsov hijacking affair, in which a group of mostly Jews and two non-Jews unsuccessfully attempted to steal a Soviet airplane and fly it to freedom.

References

External links
 

1972 drama films
1972 films
Israeli drama films
Films directed by Menahem Golan
French drama films
West German films
English-language French films
English-language German films
English-language Israeli films
Films set in the Soviet Union
Films produced by Menahem Golan
Films based on short fiction
Films with screenplays by Menahem Golan
1970s French films